Tin Soe was the Ambassador Extraordinary and Plenipotentiary of the Union of Myanmar to the Russian Federation. He was also a general in the Burmese Armed Forces, and was the father of two sons and one daughter. He died in 2013.

References 

Year of birth missing (living people)
Living people
Ambassadors of Myanmar to Russia
Ambassadors of Myanmar to Ukraine
Burmese generals
2013 deaths